The Impero is a  stream of Liguria (Italy).

Geography 
The Impero rises near Monte Grande, crosses the comunes of Aurigo, Borgomaro, Lucinasco, Chiusavecchia, Chiusanico and Pontedassio, giving its name to its valley, and ends in the Ligurian Sea in Oneglia (IM).

Impero basin (95 km2) is totally included in the Province of Imperia and also encompasses the communes of Cesio and Caravonica.

Main tributaries

Upper valley 

Upstream of the village of San Lazzaro Reale (Borgomaro) the Impero (sometimes referred as Maro in this stretch) receives the following tributaries:
 right hand:
 rio Butasso, 
 rio Noceto, 
 rio Ponte, 
 rio Ciappa, 
 rio Rovera, 
 rio Pian Cappello 
 rio Fonti del Maro;
 left hand:
 rio Calanche, 
 rio Lavandè, 
 rio Lacori.
 rio Cardei.

Rio Trexenda  

The Tresenda (or Trexenda) is the main tributary of the Impero; it rises with the name of rio Caravonica from monte Mucchio di Pietre and gets from its right bank Rio Bramoso and Rio Acquafredda. Its drainage basin is of 13.3 square kilometres.

Lower valley 
Downstream San Lazzaro Reale, where it gets Tresenda waters, the Impero receives the following streams:
 right hand:
 rio Maddalena, 
 rio Olivastri, 
 rio Baghi, 
 rio Delle Ville,
 rio Ramà;
 left hand:
 rio Lavandero, 
 rio Candelero,
 rio Viesci, 
 rio Rocca.
 rio Sgoreto.

Fishing

The Impero is not considered very interesting for fishing; upstream of Borgomaro trout coexist with cyprinids, while downstream the latter  totally outnumber other fishes.

References

See also
 List of rivers of Italy

Rivers of Italy
Rivers of Liguria
Rivers of the Province of Imperia
Rivers of the Alps
Drainage basins of the Ligurian Sea